Bernardo Flores Jr. (born August 23, 1995) is an American professional baseball pitcher for the Texas Rangers organization. He has previously played in Major League Baseball (MLB) for the Chicago White Sox and St. Louis Cardinals.

Career

Amateur career
Flores attended Baldwin Park High School in Baldwin Park, California and played college baseball at the University of Southern California (USC). After the 2015 season, he played collegiate summer baseball with the Cotuit Kettleers of the Cape Cod Baseball League.

Chicago White Sox
He was drafted by the Chicago White Sox in the seventh round of the 2016 Major League Baseball draft.

Flores made his professional debut in 2016 with the Arizona League White Sox and the Great Falls Voyagers, going 6–2 with a 3.46 ERA over 65 innings. He split the 2017 season between the Kannapolis Intimidators and Winston-Salem Dash, going 10–7 with a 3.42 ERA over  innings. He split the 2018 season between Winston-Salem and the Birmingham Barons, going a combined 8–9 with a 2.65 ERA over 156 innings. He split the 2019 season between the AZL, Kannapolis, and the Birmingham Barons, combining to go 3–8 with a 3.57 ERA over  innings. After the 2019 season, he played in the Arizona Fall League for the Glendale Desert Dogs.

Flores was added to the White Sox 40–man roster following the 2019 season.

Flores made his MLB debut against the Kansas City Royals on September 3, 2020. With the 2020 Chicago White Sox, Flores appeared in 2 games, compiling a 0-0 record with 9.00 ERA and 2 strikeouts in 2.0 innings pitched.

St. Louis Cardinals
On April 1, 2021, Flores was claimed off waivers by the St. Louis Cardinals. Flores made one appearance with the Cardinals, spending most of his time with the Triple-A Memphis Redbirds, before he was designated for assignment on June 22, 2021.

Colorado Rockies
On June 24, 2021, Flores was claimed off waivers by the Colorado Rockies and optioned to the Triple-A Albuquerque Isotopes. He was designated for assignment on September 18. Two days later, Flores was assigned outright to the Triple-A Albuquerque Isotopes. On April 1, 2022, Flores was released by the Rockies organization.

Cincinnati Reds
On April 1, 2022, the same day he was released by the Rockies, Flores signed a minor league contract with the Cincinnati Reds organization and was assigned to the Triple-A Louisville Bats. He was released on May 21, 2022.

Diablos Rojos del México
On June 3, 2022, Flores signed with the Diablos Rojos del México of the Mexican League. He appeared in 7 games, making 6 starts with a  1-0 record and 4.15 ERA with 27 strikeouts in 26.0 innings pitched.

Texas Rangers
On February 3, 2023, Flores signed a minor league contract with the Texas Rangers organization. on February 8, he was assigned to Round Rock Express.

References

External links

1995 births
Living people
People from Baldwin Park, California
Baseball players from California
Major League Baseball pitchers
Chicago White Sox players
St. Louis Cardinals players
USC Trojans baseball players
Cotuit Kettleers players
Arizona League White Sox players
Great Falls Voyagers players
Kannapolis Intimidators players
Winston-Salem Dash players
Birmingham Barons players
Glendale Desert Dogs players